AAPT may refer to:

Companies
 AAPT Limited - an Australian telecommunications company

Professional organizations
American Association of Philosophy Teachers
American Association of Physics Teachers

Software
 Android Asset Packaging Tool, to handle Android application packages